The 2005 Qatar Telecom German Open was a women's tennis event that was played in Berlin, Germany from 2 May to 8 May 2005. It was one of two Tier I events that took place on red clay in the build-up to the second Grand Slam of the year, the French Open. Justine Henin-Hardenne won the singles title.

Finals

Singles

 Justine Henin-Hardenne defeated  Nadia Petrova, 6–3, 4–6, 6–3

Doubles

 Elena Likhovtseva /  Vera Zvonareva defeated  Cara Black /  Liezel Huber, 4–6, 6–4, 6–3

Prize money

External links
 ITF tournament edition details
 Tournament draws

Qatar Telecom German Open
Berlin
WTA German Open
May 2005 sports events in Europe